"What Kinda Love" is a song recorded and co-written by Canadian country rock artist Dallas Smith. It was released in January 2013 as the fourth single from his debut solo album, Jumped Right In. It peaked at number 77 on the Canadian Hot 100 in April 2013.

Critical reception
Casadie Pederson of Top Country called the song "perhaps his best release yet." She wrote that "it can relate to so many people as we go along this journey of life and love so many things, all of which mean different things to us."

Music video
The music video was directed by Stephano Barberis and premiered in February 2013.

Chart performance
"What Kinda Love" debuted at number 95 on the Canadian Hot 100 for the week of February 23, 2013.

References

2012 songs
2013 singles
Country ballads
Dallas Smith songs
604 Records singles
Songs written by Dallas Smith
Songs written by Zac Maloy
Songs written by Joey Moi
Song recordings produced by Joey Moi
Music videos directed by Stephano Barberis